The Roman Catholic Diocese of Ningxia/Yinchuan is a Latin rite suffragan diocese in the Ecclesiastical province of the Metropolitan Archbishopric of Suiyuan, in north(west)ern China, but depends on the missionary Roman Congregation for the Evangelization of Peoples.

No statistics available. Its episcopal see is the Cathedral of the Immaculate Heart of Mary, located in the city of Yinchuan, Ningxia autonomous region.

History 
 Established on 14 March 1922 as the Apostolic Vicariate of Ningxia, on territory split off from the then Apostolic Vicariate of Southwestern Mongolia
 Promoted on 11 April 1946 as Diocese of Ningxia

Episcopal ordinaries
(all Roman rite; until 1980 European missionary members of a Latin congregation)

Apostolic Vicars of Ningxia
 Goffredo Frederix, Scheutists (C.I.C.M.) (born Belgium) (March 14, 1922–retired 1930), Titular Bishop of Thagaste (1920.03.08–1938.06.18), initially as Apostolic Vicar of Northern Kansu (China) (1920.03.05–1922.03.08); died 1938
 Gaspare Schotte, C.I.C.M. (born Belgium) (December 21, 1931–death 13 January 1944), Titular Bishop of Petinessus (1931.12.14–1944.01.13)
 Charles Joseph van Melckebeke, C.I.C.M. (born Belgium) (March 14, 1946–April 11, 1946 see below), Titular Bishop of Sufes (1946.03.14–1946.04.11)

Suffragan Bishops of Ningxia 
 Charles Joseph van Melckebeke, C.I.C.M. (see above April 11, 1946–death August 26, 1980)
 Joseph Ma Zhongmu (first Chinese incumbent) (1984–2004)
uncanonical John Baptist Liu Jing-shan (1993–20 December 2009)
 Joseph Li Jing (20 December 2009–present), succeeded as former Coadjutor Bishop of Ningxia (2007–2009).

See also 

 List of Catholic dioceses in China

References

Sources and external links 
 GCatholic.org, with Google map - data for all sections
 Catholic Hierarchy

Roman Catholic dioceses in China
Roman Catholic dioceses and prelatures established in the 20th century
Religious organizations established in 1922
Religion in Ningxia
Yinchuan